Louis Charles Antoine Desaix (17 August 176814 June 1800) was a French general and military leader during the French Revolutionary Wars. According to the usage of the time, he took the name Louis Charles Antoine Desaix de Veygoux. He was considered one of the greatest generals of the Revolutionary Wars.

Biography
Desaix was born to a noble family in the Château d'Ayat in Ayat-sur-Sioule, in the province of Auvergne, to Gilbert des Aix, Lord of Veygoux, the family manor in Charbonnières-les-Varennes, and Amable de Beaufranchet, his wife and first cousin. Desaix received his military education at the school founded by Marshal d'Effiat, and entered the French royal army. During his first six years of service, he devoted himself to duty and to military studies.  When the French Revolution broke out, he threw himself into the cause of liberty. Refusing to "emigrate", he joined the staff of Charles Louis Victor de Broglie, the Jacobin son of the duc de Broglie. This nearly cost Desaix his life, but he escaped the guillotine, and by his conspicuous service soon came into favor with the Republican government. Like many other members of the old ruling classes who had accepted the new order, the instinct of command joined to native ability, brought Desaix career success, and thus he had attained the command of a division in 1794.

During the campaign of 1795 he commanded Jourdan's right-wing, and during Moreau's invasion of Bavaria, the following year, he held an equally important command. Following the retreat which ensued when the archduke Charles won the battles of Amberg and Würzburg, Desaix commanded Moreau's rearguard, and later the fortress of Kehl, with the highest distinction, and his name became a household word, like those of Bonaparte, Jourdan, Hoche, Marceau and Kléber. Next year his initial successes were interrupted by the Preliminaries of Leoben, and he procured for himself a mission into Italy in order to meet General Bonaparte, who spared no pains to captivate the brilliant young general from the almost rival camps of Germany. Provisionally appointed commander of the "Army of England", Desaix was soon transferred by Bonaparte to the expeditionary force intended for Egypt. It was his division which bore the brunt of the Mamluk attack at the Battle of the Pyramids, and he crowned his reputation by his victories over Murad Bey in Upper Egypt. Amongst the fellaheen he acquired the significant appellation of the "Just Sultan".

When command passed to Kléber, Desaix was one of the small party selected to accompany Bonaparte. However, it was months before he could join the new First Consul. Despite the Convention of El Arish, granting Desaix right of passage, he was captured with his troops by the British led by George Keith Elphinstone, who not only refused to recognise the Convention, but pretended to consider Desaix a rank-and-file officer. Desaix was later freed by superior orders from the British Vice-Admiralty.

The campaign of 1800 was close to its climax when Desaix arrived in Italy. He was immediately assigned to the command of a corps of two infantry divisions. Three days later (14 June), detached, with Boudet's division, at Rivalta, he heard the cannon of Marengo on his right. Taking the initiative he marched at once towards the sound, meeting Bonaparte's staff officer, who had come to recall him, halfway on the route. He arrived with Boudet's division at the moment when the Austrians were victorious all along the line. Exclaiming, "There is yet time to win another battle!" he led his three regiments straight against the enemy's center. At the moment of victory, Desaix was killed by a musket ball. On the same day, Jean-Baptiste Kleber, Desaix's good friend and comrade, and the governor-general of Egypt, was assassinated in Cairo. Upon hearing the news of Desaix's death, a grief-stricken Napoleon Bonaparte exclaimed, "Why am I not allowed to weep?"

Memory

Napoleon paid tribute to Desaix by erecting monuments to him, one on the Place Dauphine and the other in the Place des Victoires in Paris. The memorial in the Place des Victoires was later destroyed. A monumental tomb with sculptures by Jean-Guillaume Moitte serves as his final resting place at the Great St Bernard Hospice (his body originally lay in Milan and was moved to the Hospice in 1805). Moreover, his name is written on a face of the Arc de Triomphe, with other great military figures of the French Revolution. There is also a fort, in Fort-de-France, Martinique, that is named Fort Desaix in his honor. A street, Rue Desaix, and a parallel cul-de-sac, Square Desaix, in the fifteenth arrondissement of Paris, between two metro stations, Bir-Hakeim and Dupleix, also bear his name. Desaix Boulevard is a major street in the Bayou St. John / Fairgrounds district of New Orleans. Several ships of the French Navy have borne the name Desaix in his honor.

Notes

References
Attribution:
 Cites as a source:

External links

1768 births
1800 deaths
French generals
French Republican military leaders killed in the French Revolutionary Wars
Names inscribed under the Arc de Triomphe
People from Puy-de-Dôme